Kumara Vijayam is a 1976 Indian Tamil-language comedy drama film directed by A. Jagannathan. The film stars Kamal Haasan, Jayachitra and Malayalam actor M. G. Soman. It is based on the play Perumal Satchi by Komal Swaminathan. The film was released on 30 July 1976.

Plot

Cast 
 Kamal Haasan as Kumar
 Jayachitra as Nirmala
 V. K. Ramasamy as Muruganantham
 Sukumari as Paarvathi
 Thengai Srinivasan as Seenu
 Suruli Rajan as Chakravarthi
 M. G. Soman as Vinoth
 Master Sekhar

Production 
The film was adapted from the Tamil stage play Perumal Satchi by Komal Swaminathan. The play was previously filmed in Malayalam as Paalazhi Madhanam (1975) by the same production company and crew.

Soundtrack 
The soundtrack was composed by G. Devarajan; the lyrics were written by Kannadasan, Pulamaipithan and Poovai Senguttavan.

Release and reception 
Kumara Vijayam was released on 30 July 1976. Kanthan of Kalki in his review wrote just calling it a comedy and not making the film a mere farce, adding the story gives the film a special character and concluded the film can be watched and enjoyed.

References

External links 
 

1970s Tamil-language films
1976 comedy-drama films
1976 films
Films directed by A. Jagannathan
Indian black-and-white films
Indian comedy-drama films
Indian films based on plays